Human Hours is a 2018 collection of poetry and essays written by Catherine Barnett, published by Graywolf Press. The collection received positive reviews.

Development
Originally, Barnett intended to call the book The Accursed Questions. Barnett first heard the term from poet Ilya Kaminsky, in reference to the "huge questions of humanity" addressed by "nineteenth-century Russian novelists".

Barnett drew inspiration from Ellen Bryant Voigt's collection Headwaters and Samuel Beckett's 1961 play Happy Days during the book's composition.

Reception
According to literary review aggregator Book Marks, the collection received mostly "Positive" reviews. A review in Publishers Weekly referred to the book as "elegantly understated".

References

American poetry collections
2018 poetry books
Graywolf Press books